Streptomyces glaucosporus is a bacterium species from the genus of Streptomyces which has been isolated from soil.

See also
List of Streptomyces species

References

Further reading

External links
Type strain of Streptomyces glaucosporus at BacDive -  the Bacterial Diversity Metadatabase

glaucosporus
Bacteria described in 1986